Trent's Last Case is a 1920 British silent crime film directed by Richard Garrick and starring Gregory Scott, Pauline Peters and Clive Brook. It is an adaptation of the 1913 novel Trent's Last Case by E. C. Bentley. Detective Philip Trent investigates the mysterious murder of the financier Sigsbee Manderson.

Cast
 Gregory Scott – Philip Trent 
 Pauline Peters – Mabel Manderson 
 Clive Brook – John Marlow 
 George Foley – Sigsbee Manderson 
 Cameron Carr – Inspector Murch 
 P. E. Hubbard – Nathaniel Cupples 
 Richard Norton – Martin

References

External links

1920 films
Films based on British novels
Films based on mystery novels
Films directed by Richard Garrick
1920 crime films
Films set in England
Broadwest films
British silent feature films
British black-and-white films
Films based on works by Edmund Clerihew Bentley
1920s English-language films
Silent mystery films